Nannoscincus fuscus is a species of skink found in New Caledonia.

References

Nannoscincus
Reptiles described in 1872
Skinks of New Caledonia
Endemic fauna of New Caledonia
Taxa named by Albert Günther